Sampling is the use of a subset of the population to represent the whole population or to inform about (social) processes that are meaningful beyond the particular cases, individuals or sites studied.  Probability sampling, or random sampling, is a sampling technique in which  the probability of getting any particular sample may be calculated. In cases where external validity is not of critical importance to the study's goals or purpose, researchers might prefer to use nonprobability sampling.  Nonprobability sampling does not meet this criterion. Nonprobability sampling techniques are not intended to be used to infer from the sample to the general population in statistical terms. Instead, for example, grounded theory can be produced through iterative nonprobability sampling until theoretical saturation is reached (Strauss and Corbin, 1990).

Thus, one cannot say the same on the basis of a nonprobability sample than on the basis of a probability sample. The grounds for drawing generalizations (e.g., propose new theory, propose policy) from studies based on nonprobability samples are based on the notion of "theoretical saturation" and "analytical generalization" (Yin, 2014) instead of on statistical generalization. 

Researchers working with the notion of purposive sampling assert that while probability methods are suitable for large-scale studies concerned with representativeness, nonprobability approaches are more suitable for in-depth qualitative research in which the focus is often to understand complex social phenomena (e.g., Marshall 1996; Small 2009). One of the advantages of nonprobability sampling is its lower cost compared to probability sampling. Moreover, the in-depth analysis of a small-N purposive sample or a case study enables the "discovery" and identification of patterns and causal mechanisms that do not draw time and context-free assumptions.

Nonprobability sampling is often not appropriate in statistical quantitative research, though, as these assertions raise some questions — how can one understand a complex social phenomenon by drawing only the most convenient expressions of that phenomenon into consideration? What assumption about homogeneity in the world must one make to justify such assertions? Alas, the consideration that research can only be based in statistical inference focuses on the problems of bias linked to nonprobability sampling and acknowledges only one situation in which a nonprobability sample can be appropriate — if one is interested only in the specific cases studied (for example, if one is interested in the Battle of Gettysburg), one does not need to draw a probability sample from similar cases (Lucas 2014a).

Nonprobability sampling is however widely used in qualitative research. Examples of nonprobability sampling include:
 Convenience, haphazard or accidental sampling – members of the population are chosen based on their relative ease of access.  To sample friends, co-workers, or shoppers at a single mall, are all examples of convenience sampling.  Such samples are biased because researchers may unconsciously approach some kinds of respondents and avoid others (Lucas 2014a), and respondents who volunteer for a study may differ in unknown but important ways from others (Wiederman 1999).
 Consecutive sampling –  also known as total enumerative sampling, is a sampling technique in which every subject meeting the criteria of inclusion is selected until the required sample size is achieved. 
 Snowball sampling – The first respondent refers an acquaintance. The friend also refers a friend, and so on.  Such samples are biased because they give people with more social connections an unknown but higher chance of selection (Berg 2006), but lead to higher response rates.
 Judgmental sampling or purposive sampling – The researcher chooses the sample based on who they think would be appropriate for the study. This is used primarily when there is a limited number of people that have expertise in the area being researched, or when the interest of the research is on a specific field or a small group. Different types of purposive sampling include:
 Deviant case – The researcher obtains cases that substantially differ from the dominant pattern (a special type of purposive sample). The case is selected in order to obtain information on unusual cases that can be specially problematic or specially good.
 Case study – The research is limited to one group, often with a similar characteristic or of small size. 
 Ad hoc quotas – A quota is established (e.g. 65% women) and researchers are free to choose any respondent they wish as long as the quota is met.

 Quota Sampling – This is similar to stratified random sampling, in which the researcher identifies subsets of the population of interest and then sets a target number for each category in the sample. Next, the researcher samples from the population of interest nonrandomly until the quotas are filled.  Nonprobability sampling should not intend to obtain the same types of results or be held to the same quality standards as those of probability sampling (Steinke, 2004).

Studies intended to use probability sampling sometimes end up using nonprobability samples because of characteristics of the sampling method. For example, using a sample of people in the paid labor force to analyze the effect of education on earnings is to use a nonprobability sample of persons who could be in the paid labor force. Because the education people obtain could determine their likelihood of being in the paid labor force, the sample in the paid labor force is a nonprobability sample for the question at issue. In such cases results are biased.

The statistical model one uses can also render the data a nonprobability sample. For example, Lucas (2014b) notes that several published studies that use multilevel modeling have been based on samples that are probability samples in general, but nonprobability samples for one or more of the levels of analysis in the study. Evidence indicates that in such cases the bias is poorly behaved, such that inferences from such analyses are unjustified.

These problems occur in the academic literature, but they may be more common in non-academic research. For example, in public opinion polling by private companies (or other organizations unable to require response), the sample can be self-selected rather than random. This often introduces an important type of error, self-selection bias, in which a potential participant's willingness to volunteer for the sample may be determined by characteristics such as submissiveness or availability. The samples in such surveys should be treated as nonprobability samples of the population, and the validity of the findings based on them is unknown and cannot be established.

See also
 Sampling (statistics)
 Cluster sampling
 Judgment sample
 Multistage sampling
 Quota sampling
 Simple random sample
 Systematic sampling
 Stratified sampling

References

Berg, Sven.  (2006).  "Snowball Sampling–I," pp. 7817–7821 in Encyclopedia of Statistical Sciences, edited by Samuel Kotz, Campbell Read, N. Balakrishnan, and Brani Vidakovic.  Hoboken, NJ: John Wiley and Sons, Inc.
Lucas, Samuel R. (2014a).  "Beyond the Existence Proof:  Ontological Conditions, Epistemological Implications, and In-Depth Interview Research.",  Quality & Quantity, 48: 387–408. .
Lucas, Samuel R. (2014b).  "An Inconvenient Dataset: Bias and Inappropriate Inference in the Multilevel Model.",  Quality & Quantity, 48: 1619–1649. 
Marshall, Martin N. (1996). "Sampling for Qualitative Research." Family Practice 13: 522–526. 
Small, Mario L. (2009). "‘How many cases do I need?’ On science and the logic of case selection in field-based research." Ethnography 10: 5–38. 
Steinke, I. (2004). "Quality criteria in qualitative research". A companion to qualitative research, 184–190. London: Sage Publications
Strauss, A. and Corbin, J. (1990). "Basics of Qualitative Research". London: Sage Publications.
 Wiederman, Michael W.  (1999).  "Volunteer bias in sexuality research using college student participants." Journal of Sex Research, 36: 59–66, .
Yin, Robert K. (2014[1984]). Case study research: Design and methods. Thousand Oaks: Sage publications.

Sampling techniques